A vaginal microbicide is a microbicide for vaginal use. Most commonly such a product would be a topical gel or cream inserted into the vagina so that it may treat some infection in the vagina, such as types of vaginitis.

Along with rectal microbicides, vaginal microbicides are currently the subject of medical research on microbicides for sexually transmitted diseases to determine the circumstances under which and the extent to which they provide protection against infection. Researchers are trying to develop a product which would act as protection against the contraction of a sexually transmitted infection during vaginal sexual intercourse.

Vaginal microbicides for sexually transmitted diseases

Scientists are trying to develop effective microbicides to reduce the risk of contracting a sexually transmitted infection, and in particular, to reduce the risk of contracting HIV.

Target market
Researchers have investigated who has interest in using a vaginal microbicide.  Condoms are highly effective in preventing the transmission of infection, but worldwide, the decision to use condoms is more often a decision made by males than females. A vaginal microbicide which could prevent sexual transmission of infection would further empower women to influence the result of their sexual encounters. The demographic interested in using the produce included women with the following characteristics:

 use condoms to prevent infection
 have previously had a sexually transmitted infection
 have a sexual partner who had another sexual partner in the past year
 minority group
 low income
 unmarried and not cohabiting
 no steady sexual partner

The number of women interested in using such a product has been characterized as being significant enough to merit product development and marketing.

Characteristics
The ideal vaginal microbicide would have the following characteristics:
 provide protection against infection
 not require application at the time of intercourse
 not harm the natural tissue

The criteria of not harming natural tissue has been the most troublesome aspect of product design.

For HIV
Several unrelated chemical mechanisms have been proposed for vaginal microbicides.  In all cases, the medicine would be contained in a gel or cream substrate and then inserted into the vagina, where the medicine would activate.

Surfactants
The first vaginal microbicide which researchers studied was nonoxynol-9, which acted as a surfactant.

Blocking HIV binding
PRO 2000, carrageenan, and cellulose sulphate have all been studied as microbicides to block HIV binding.

Topical antiretrovirals
Tenofovir has been studied as a topical antiretroviral. One example of a tenofovir study is CAPRISA 004.

References

External links
 Tips to Maintaining a Healthy Vagina

Microbicides
Prevention of HIV/AIDS
Sexually transmitted diseases and infections
Vagina